3GNY (Third Generation New York) is a non-profit organization composed of the Jewish grandchildren of Holocaust survivors. The mission of the group "is to educate people about the Holocaust by telling the stories of their families, to provide a forum where the grandchildren of survivors can connect, and to fight intolerance and ethnic violence wherever it exists."

3G refers to "Third Generation," a term used to denote grandchildren of Holocaust survivors.

History
3GNY was founded in 2006 by Daniel Brooks. The organization began with six people and has since expanded to more than 1,500 members.

Activities
3GNY meets approximately once a month, for programming that includes "Shabbat dinners, discussion groups, genealogy and writing workshops, museum tours and happy hours." The organization continues to hear directly from the survivors of the Holocaust as well as survivors from other genocides, such as Rwanda and Darfur.

In 2010, 3GNY launched an educational initiative entitled "WEDU" (We Educate), developed in conjunction with Facing History and Ourselves and the American Society for Yad Vashem. The objective of the program is to empower the "grandchildren of survivors to learn and share their family histories and lessons of the Holocaust with students in school classrooms." Since the initiative's launch, 3GNY representatives have presented in over fifteen schools.

The New York Times profiled 3GNY in 2010 when Ike Davis, the first baseman for the New York Mets, met with the group. The mother of Davis is Jewish and many of her relatives were murdered in the Holocaust. Davis' great aunt though, survived the Holocaust. Regarding the event with 3GNY, Davis said, "I thought it was really cool meeting with them. These are people around my age who are trying to keep alive the memory of their family members and loved ones, maybe even people they never got to meet, so people never forget what happened."

References

External links
 

Jewish organizations based in the United States
Jewish educational organizations
Holocaust commemoration
Non-profit organizations based in New York City
2006 establishments in New York City
Charities based in New York City
Jewish organizations based in New Jersey